Sexlessness is the state of being either without sexual activity, or without a biological sex. It may refer to:

 Asexuality, the lack of sexual attraction to others, or low or absent interest in or desire for sexual activity
 Sexual abstinence, the practice of refraining from some or all aspects of sexual activity
 Celibacy, the state of voluntarily being unmarried, sexually abstinent, or both
 Incels, a controversial online subculture of "involuntary celibates"
 Sexless marriage, a marital union in which little or no sexual activity occurs between the two spouses
Gonadal agenesis, when a male child is born without gonads and consequently develops no testes
Aphallia, a congenital malformation in which the phallus (penis or clitoris) is absent

See also 
 Asexual (disambiguation)
 Genderless (disambiguation)